La Terra Trema ("The Earth Trembles") is a 1948 Italian neorealist film directed, co-written, and produced by Luchino Visconti. A loose adaptation of the 1881 novel I Malavoglia by Giovanni Verga, the film documents the economic and personal struggles of poor Sicilian fishermen. The film is docufictional, featuring a cast of non-professional actors and a mix of scripted and unscripted sequences. It is considered one of the essential films of the neorealist movement, and was named one of the top ten films of all time in the 1962 Sight & Sound poll.

Plot
The film can be divided into five sections: a prologue, three main phases and an epilogue.

The Valastros are family of working class fishermen in Aci Trezza, a small fishing village on the east coast of Sicily. The first phase tells us about the fishermen's attempt to improve their economic circumstances. They demand a better price for their fish, urged by the eldest son 'Ntoni, to throw the wholesalers' scales into the ocean. The fishermen end up in jail. The wholesalers realize it is more profitable to have 'Ntoni and his friends fishing, so they have the fishermen released. 'Ntoni, who lived on the mainland for a time, had brought some new, open-minded ideas back to Sicily, and he tries to form a cooperative, but no one joins him. In deciding to do it on his own, he convinces his family to mortgage their house to buy a boat and starts his new life. A festive mood is present in this sequence, with all the village joining the Valastro family salting fish in laughter and joy.

The second part shows the Valastros' vulnerability. They realize that the price of being owners is high; they not only have to buy the salt but also work hard and not stop even in the hardest storm, risking their lives to be able to feed so many mouths at home.  When they go out in a particularly bad storm, their new boat is severely damaged, and the Valastros have no money to get it repaired.  At this point in the film, we see the other fishermen and the wholesalers mocking them already, convinced of the immutability of the prevailing social order.

The third phase of the film affirms the Valastros' vulnerability and traces their decline. The social and psychological consequences of the Valastros' attempt to change things are gradually revealed. They go out of work, no one wants to give them any opportunities, and the wholesalers are able to set the price for their fish. In the scene showing the wholesalers increasing the prices yet again, we can see the faces of the children registering amazement at the cruelty of the adults.  This was quite a common feature in neorealist films, and one almost sees this as an awakening of consciousness.

The family unit, so strong in the beginning of the film, breaks down. Now they have no family, no house, the grandfather dies, 'Ntoni's brother Cola leaves for the mainland to seek new opportunities, their sister Lucia loses her reputation, yielding to the seduction of Marshal Don Salvatore, and 'Ntoni starts drinking. Only the elder sister Mara remains strong, although she loses all hope of ever getting married because her family is now poorer than before.

In the epilogue, 'Ntoni finally overcomes his pride, recognizing the true cause of the problems of his kind and his class, and sees the need for collective action by going back with his two young brothers, Vanni and Alessio, to work as a day laborer for the wholesalers, who have bought new boats.

The entire mood of the film becomes oppressive since the camera never leaves Aci Trezza, except in the scenes at sea at the beginning and end of the film. The outside world appears only indirectly when 'Ntoni goes to prison, when the family goes to sign a contract with the bank, when a stranger offering American cigarettes appears to tempt the youngsters to move to the mainland, and when the old baroness honors the inauguration of the wholesalers' new boats with her presence. Some allusions to modern Italian history are also there. On the wall of the restaurant we can see an image of a hammer and sickle. One of the wholesalers suddenly says: "The country is full of communism!", and his colleague answers: "Raimondo is always right," in a parody of the Fascist slogan, "Il Duce is always right." At the end of the film, a faded text can be seen behind Raimondo:
Go with determination toward people. ~ Benito Mussolini.

Cast

Background
During the 1940s, Luchino Visconti used fiction to express his feelings about the Second World War and its effects on Italian society. Visconti's work combined a firm narrative structure with deep humanism. He wrote novels and plays, but ended up deciding to channel his creative energies into theatrical productions and films. As Visconti built his reputation in the theater, the Communist Party commissioned him to make a documentary film about fishermen that was to be used as propaganda in the 1948 election campaign. Visconti took this opportunity to accomplish an old desire: adapting Giovanni Verga's I Malavoglia (the 1881 The House by the Medlar Tree) for the screen, having acquired the film rights in 1941.

He travelled to Aci Trezza in Sicily, where Verga's novel takes place, and found that it had hardly changed since the 1880s. Considering this, Visconti in neorealist fashion, decided to shoot the film in actual Sicilian locations and also to use local people as actors. Visconti believed these ordinary people could portray the truth about themselves better than actors assuming roles.

The film ended up different from either the idea of a documentary about fishermen or the adaptation of the novel I Malavoglia. Originally Visconti planned to shoot a trilogy, where the first part would tell about the fishermen and would have ended in defeat. The second part would tell about peasants and would have ended in a stalemate between exploiters and the exploited. Finally, the third part would be about miners, ending in a triumph of solidarity of the oppressed. The decision to shoot only the first part came about as the importance of the so-called "episode of the sea" increased in its association with Verga. Having realized this, Visconti decided to conclude it on a note of resigned defeat and not in a miraculous victory.

A large chapter of the book by Silvia Iannello Le immagini e le parole dei Malavoglia (Sovera, Roma, 2008) is devoted to the origins, comments, and some images taken from the immortal movie of Luchino Visconti.

Film style
The use of fades and dissolves creates an almost solemn effect of time passing while people are engaged in everyday tasks. Long takes help to convey the feeling of tranquility that persists until the family's economic downfall. From then on, long takes are used to reveal lonely figures in desolate environments or people in confrontation with one another. Visconti keeps the spectator at a slight distance from the characters and events, and it is both an aesthetic and ethical choice, a gesture of respect for the life of the people of Aci Trezza.

Music
Since 1941 Visconti had known that the most important aspect of his Verga adaptation would be his ideal of "internal and musical rhythm." With Willy Ferrero's help, he used some Sicilian folk music, but music is quite sparse in the film until we move towards the ending where it does increase, emphasizing the fate of the Valastros. Don Salvatore whistling tunes from operas, the poignant melodies played by uncle Nunzio, the sounds of the wind and the sea, of ships returning to the harbor, cries from the streets, and the musicality of the Sicilian language create their own archaic atmosphere.

Narration
After the film was completed, a voice-over commentary written by Antonio Pietrangeli had to be added, since no Italian was spoken by the participants. At the beginning of the film he states that "...Italian is not a language of the poor." Also, the commentary takes an important narrative and thematic function. The poetic quality of the voice and the words are a part of the classical unity of the film, being a crucial part of its structure.  Some examples include:
...It is just a matter of time, as the worm said to the stone, I'll bore a hole through you yet.

One by one, the tree's branches wither and fall.

If there's any relief, a moment's happiness, it's the thought of one's girl. And for her, one can do without sleep. Because a man's made to be caught by a girl, just as the fishes of the sea are made for those who catch them.

Critical reception
La Terra Trema currently holds a 90% approval rating on Rotten Tomatoes. It received the International Prize at the 9th Venice International Film Festival in 1948, and was nominated for the Golden Lion.

See also
 Docufiction
 List of docufiction films

References

Bibliography
 Iannello, Silvia, "I Malavoglia e La terra trema", in Le immagini e le parole dei Malavoglia, Sovera, Roma, 2008, pag. 30-36.
 Almond, Mark, The Revolution's Golden Book, Ediouro Press, Brazil, 2003.
 Bacon, Henry, Visconti: Explorations of Beauty and Decay, Cambridge University Press, 1998.
 Nowell-Smith, Geoffrey, The Oxford History of World Cinema, Oxford University Press, 1996.

Footnotes

External links

 
 

1948 films
Italian black-and-white films
Films set in Sicily
Films shot in Sicily
Ethnofiction films
Films about fishing
Films based on Italian novels
Films directed by Luchino Visconti
Films set in the Mediterranean Sea
Italian independent films
1940s Italian-language films
Sicilian-language films
Italian neorealist films
Italian political drama films
Films based on works by Giovanni Verga
1940s political drama films
1948 drama films
1940s independent films
Aci Castello
1940s Italian films